is the second studio album by Japanese group Garnet Crow. It was released on April 24, 2002 under Giza Studio.

Background
The album consist of four previously released singles.

Two out of twelve tracks, Mysterious eyes and Timeless Sleep received in this album new album mixes under title dry flavor of "G" mix, which has more techno sound and Flow-ing surround mix which is slower and less rock than original. Both of the bonus tracks were arranged by Miguel Sá Pessoa.

The singles call my name was released in Giza Studio compilation album Giza Studio Masterpiece Blend 2001 and Yume Mita Atode was released in another compilation album Giza Studio Masterpiece Blend 2002.

Commercial performance 
"Sparkle: Sujigakidōri no Sky Blue" made its chart debut on the official Oricon Albums Chart at #4 rank for first week with 73,010 sold copies. It charted for 9 weeks and sold 156,410 copies.

Track listing 
All tracks are composed by Yuri Nakamura, written by Nana Azuki and arranged by Hirohito Furui.

Bonus tracks

Personnel
Credits adapted from the CD booklet of Sparkle: Sujigakidōri no Sky Blue.

Yuri Nakamura - vocals, composing
Nana Azuki - songwriting, keyboard
Hirohito Furui - arranging, keyboard
Hitoshi Okamoto - guitar, backing chorus
Miguel Sá Pessoa - keyboards, recording, mixing, arranging, sound producer
Yoshinobu Ohga (nothin' but love) - guitar
Aaron-Hsu-Flanders - acoustic guitar
John Clark - electric guitar

Yoshinori Akari - recording engineer
Katsuyuki Yoshimatsu - recording engineer
Tatsuya Okada - recording engineer
Aki Morimoto - recording engineer
Akio Nakajima - mixing engineer
Takayuki Ichikawa - mixing engineer
Toshiyui Ebihara: A&R
Gan Kojima – art direction
Kanonji - producing

Usage in media 
Last Love Song - ending theme for TV Asahi program Beat Takeshi's TV Tackle
Call my name - ending theme for Anime television series Project ARMS
Timeless sleep - ending theme for Anime television series Project ARMS
Yume Mita Ato de - ending theme for Anime television series Detective Conan
Naked Story - opening theme for Anime television series Secret of Cerulean Sand
Sky Blue - ending theme for Tokyo Broadcasting System Television program Sunday Japan
Holy Ground - ending theme for Nihon TV program Bakushou Mondai no Susume

References 

2002 albums
Being Inc. albums
Giza Studio albums
Japanese-language albums
Garnet Crow albums
Albums produced by Daiko Nagato